This is a list of primary schools and secondary schools located in the Asian country of Iran. Tertiary schools are listed at the List of universities in Iran.

Isfahan 
Schools in the city of Isfahan, Isfahan Province, include:

 Shahid Mohammad Mahdi Nillfourooshzade High school (magnet school)
 Esfahan Schools
 Emam Mohammad Bagher High School
 Safoora High School
 Shahid Saaed Hashemi High School (Magnet school)
 Khomeyni's Schools
 Safavi Schools
 Tiz Hoshan Schools

Tehran 
Schools in the city of Tehran, Tehran Province, include:

 Alborz School (magnet school)
 Allameh Helli School (magnet school)
 Farzanegan 1 school (magnet school)
 Allameh Tabatabaei School (magnet school)
 Ayeen Tarbiat-Ekbatan
 Energy Atomy School (magnet school) 
 Kamal High-school
 Mofid High Schools
 Nokhbegan e Allameh Tabatabaei Schools 
 Rouzbeh Schools
 Roshd Highschool (magnet school)
 Salam School (magnet school)
 Shahid Rajaei Upper Secondary
 Mizan School
Nazam Military High school Tehran
 Ahrar Vocational School

Tehran International School

Mashhad 
Schools in the city of Mashhad, Razavi Khorasan Province, include:

 Shahid Hashemi Nejad (1-2-3 -4)  High Schools (Sampad)
 Farzanegan (1-2-3-4-5) High Schools (Sampad)
 Hashemi Nejad (1-2-3-4) Middle Schools (Sampad)
 Farzanegan (1-2-3) Middle Schools (Sampad)
 Imam Reza Educational Complex (High School & Middle school)
 Besat Educational Complex
 Meftah high schools 
 Allameh Tabatabaei Educational and Cultural centre
 Sherkat Farsh high school
 Kosar Middle School
 Mosalla Nejad Educational Complex
 Omidvar Educational Complex
 Ardakani Middle School (governmental school)
 Shokooh-e- Iranian School (International School)

Karaj 
Schools in the city of Karaj, Alborz Province, include:

 Alborz High School
 Dehkhoda High School
 Dr. Hesabi High School
 Dr. Moein High School
 Farzanegan High School
 Farzanegan Middle School
 Kashanipoor High School
 Shahid Beheshti High School
 Shahid Rahimi High School
 Shahid Rajaee High School
 Shahid Soltani School
Shahid Soltani1 High School
 Shahid Bahonar1 High School

Shiraz 
Schools in the city of Shiraz, Fars Province, include:

 Alavi School
 Dastgheib (Tizhooshan) 1, 2 & 3
 Dr. Hessabi Schools
 Ebn Sina School
 Ehsan School
 Emamreza School
 Farzanegans (Tizhooshans)
 Fereshtegan School
 Haj Ghavam School
 Meraj School
 Nia Kowsari School
 Oloom Pezeshki School
 Shahed Schools
 Yas School
 Haniyeh Schools

Other schools

 Aftab Azarin (Ecole Bilingue De Teheran) School
 Armenian Schools in Iran
 Azadi Schools
 Bahman Schools (22)
 Derakhshesh Schools
 Dr Gharib Schools
 Dr. Hesabi School
 Dr Shariaaty Schools
 Emam Schools
 Energy Atomy Schools
 Enghelab Islamy Schools
 Farvardin Schools (12)
 Germany's School in Iran
 Golestan Schools
 Iran's Schools
 Khomeyni's Schools
 Kooshesh School
 Leader Schools
 Mehraein Schools
 Modern Schools
 Omid Schools
 President Schools
 Public Islamic of Iran
 Refah Schools
 Shahid Bahonar Schools
 Salam Schools
 Salehin High School
 Sarsabz Schools
 Shahid Beheshty Schools
 Shahid Motahary Schools
 Shahid Rajaee Schools
 Soodeh High School
 Tehran Schools
 Tiz Hoshan Schools
 Toloo High School
 World's School in Iran

Yazd 
Schools in the city of Yazd, Yazd Province, include:

Iranshahr High School

See also

 Education in Iran
 Lists of schools

References 

Schools
Schools
Schools
Iran
Iran